Cloverdale is an unincorporated community in Bloomingdale Township, DuPage County, Illinois, United States. Cloverdale is located near Old Gary Avenue and Army Trail Road, near Bloomingdale.

History
From the late 1880s, Cloverdale was a milk stop on the Illinois Central Gulf railroad, and during the early 1900s, it was a stop on the Chicago, Dubuque, Sioux City and Omaha line of the Illinois Central Railroad.

References

Unincorporated communities in DuPage County, Illinois
Unincorporated communities in Illinois
1880s establishments in Illinois